In analytic number theory and related branches of mathematics, a complex-valued arithmetic function   is a Dirichlet character of modulus  (where  is a positive integer) if for all integers  and :

1)      i.e.  is completely multiplicative.

2)     (gcd is the greatest common divisor)

3)   ; i.e.  is periodic with period .
The simplest possible character, called the principal character, usually denoted , (see Notation below) exists for all moduli:

The German mathematician Peter Gustav Lejeune Dirichlet—for whom the character is named—introduced these functions in his 1837 paper on primes in arithmetic progressions.

Notation 

 is Euler's totient function.

 is a complex primitive n-th root of unity:
 but 

 is the group of units mod . It has order 

 is the group of Dirichlet characters mod .

 etc. are  prime numbers.

 is a standard abbreviation for 

 etc. are Dirichlet characters. (the lowercase Greek letter chi for character)

There is no standard notation for Dirichlet characters that includes the modulus. In many contexts (such as in the proof of Dirichlet's theorem) the modulus is fixed. In other contexts, such as this article, characters of different moduli appear. Where appropriate this article employs a variation of Conrey labeling (introduced by Brian Conrey and used by the LMFDB).

In this labeling characters for modulus  are denoted  where the index  is described in the section the group of characters below. In this labeling,  denotes an unspecified character and
 denotes the principal character mod .

Relation to group characters 

The word "character" is used several ways in mathematics. In this section it refers to a homomorphism from a group  (written multiplicatively) to the multiplicative group of the field of complex numbers:

The set of characters is denoted  If the product of two characters is defined by pointwise multiplication  the identity by the trivial character  and the inverse by complex inversion   then  becomes an abelian group.

If  is a finite abelian group then there are 1) an isomorphism  and 2) the orthogonality relations:

     and      

The elements of the finite abelian group  are the residue classes  where 

A group character  can be extended to a Dirichlet character  by defining

and conversely, a Dirichlet character mod  defines a group character on 

Paraphrasing Davenport Dirichlet characters can be regarded as a particular case of  Abelian group characters. But this article follows Dirichlet in giving a direct and constructive account of them. This is partly for historical reasons, in that Dirichlet's work preceded by several decades the development of group theory, and partly for a mathematical reason, namely that the group in question has a simple and interesting structure which is obscured if one treats it as one treats the general Abelian group.

Elementary facts 

4) Since   property 2) says  so it can be canceled from both sides of  :

5) Property 3) is equivalent to

if    then 

6) Property 1) implies that, for any positive integer 

7) Euler's theorem states that if  then  Therefore,

This implies there are only a finite number of characters for a given modulus.

   ( obviously satisfies 1-3).

The principal character is an identity:

Then
 so  which extends 6) to all integers.

The complex conjugate of a root of unity is also its inverse (see here for details), so for 
   ( also obviously satisfies 1-3).

Thus for all integers 
   in other words  . 

10) The multiplication and identity defined in 8) and the inversion defined in 9) turn the set of Dirichlet characters for a given modulus into a finite abelian group.

The group of characters 

There are three different cases because the groups   have different structures depending on whether  is a power of 2, a power of an odd prime, or the product of prime powers.

Powers of odd primes 

If  is an odd number  is cyclic of order ; a generator is called a primitive root mod .

For  if and only if  Since
    is determined by its value at 

Let   be a primitive -th root of unity.
 These distinct values give rise to   Dirichlet characters mod  For  define  as

 showing that  is a character and
 which gives an explicit isomorphism

Examples m = 3, 5, 7, 9 
2 is a primitive root mod 3.  

.
The nonzero values of the characters mod 3 are

2 is a primitive root mod 5.  

.
The nonzero values of the characters mod 5 are

3 is a primitive root mod 7.  

.
The nonzero values of the characters mod 7 are 
.

2 is a primitive root mod 9.  

.
The nonzero values of the characters mod 9 are 
.

Powers of 2 

 is the trivial group with one element.  is cyclic of order 2. For 8, 16, and higher powers of 2, there is no primitive root; the powers of 5 are the units  and their negatives are the units 
For example

Let ; then  is the direct product of a cyclic group of order 2 (generated by −1) and a cyclic group of order  (generated by 5).

For odd  and  if and only if  and 

Let  be a primitive -th root of unity.
 These distinct values give rise to   Dirichlet characters mod  For odd  define  by

 showing that  is a character and
 showing that

Examples m = 2, 4, 8, 16 

The only character mod 2 is the principal character .

−1 is a primitive root mod 4

The  nonzero values of the characters mod 4 are

−1 is and 5 generate the units mod 8

.

The  nonzero values of the characters mod 8 are

−1 and 5 generate the units mod 16
.

The  nonzero values of the characters mod 16 are

.

Products of prime powers 

Let  be the factorization of  into prime powers. The group of units mod  is isomorphic to the direct product of the groups mod the :

and 2) multiplication mod  corresponds to coordinate-wise multiplication of -tuples:   corresponds to  where 

There are subgroups  such that 
 and

Then 
and every  corresponds to a -tuple   where  and   
Every  can be uniquely factored as 

If  is a character mod  on the subgroup  it must be identical to some  mod  Then

For  define

 showing that  is a character and
 showing an isomorphism

Examples m = 15, 24, 40 

The factorization of the characters mod 15 is

The nonzero values of the characters mod 15 are

.

The factorization of the characters mod 24 is

The nonzero values of the characters mod 24 are

.

The factorization of the characters mod 40 is

The nonzero values of the characters mod 40 are

.

Summary 

There are  Dirichlet characters mod  They are denoted by  where  is equivalent to 
The identity  is an isomorphism 

Each character mod  has a unique factorization as the product of characters mod the prime powers dividing :

Also,

Orthogonality 

The two orthogonality relations are
     and      
where the first sum has one summand per residue class.

The relations can  be written in the symmetric form
     and      

The identity  for  shows that the relations are equivalent to each other.

The first relation is easy to prove: If  there are  non-zero summands each equal to 1. Otherwise there is some   Then
   implying

The first factor is not zero, therefore the second one is. Since the relations are equivalent, the second one is also proved. QED

The second relation can be proven directly in the same way, but requires a lemma
Given  there is a 

The second relation has an important corollary: if  define the function
   Then

That is  the indicator function of the residue class . It is basic in the proof of Dirichlet's theorem.

Classification of characters

Conductor; Primitive and induced characters 

Any character mod a prime power is also a character mod every larger power. For example, mod 16

 has period 16, but  has period 8 and  has period 4:    and  
If the modulus and conductor are equal the character is primitive, otherwise imprimitive.

A related phenomenon can happen with a character mod the product of primes; its nonzero values may be periodic with a smaller period.

For example, mod 15,
.

The nonzero values of  have period 15, but those of  have period 3 and those of  have period 5. This is easier to see by juxtaposing them with characters mod 3 and 5:

.

If a character mod   is defined as
,   or equivalently as 
its nonzero values are determined by the character mod  and have period .

The smallest period of the nonzero values is the conductor of the character.

As in the prime-power case, if the conductor equals the modulus the character is primitive, otherwise imprimitive. If imprimitive it is induced from the character with the smaller modulus.

The principal character is not primitive.

The character  is primitive if and only if each of the factors is primitive.

Primitive characters often simplify (or make possible) formulas in the theories of L-functions and modular forms.

Parity 

 is even if   and is odd if 

This distinction appears in the functional equation of the Dirichlet L-function.

Order 

Real characters 

 is real or quadratic if all of its values are real (they must be ); otherwise it is complex or imaginary.

 is real if and only if  ;  is real if and only if ; in particular,  is real and non-principal.

Dirichlet's original proof that  (which was only valid for prime moduli) took two different forms depending on whether  was real or not. His later proof, valid for all moduli, was based on his class number formula.

Real characters are Kronecker symbols; for example, the principal character can be written
.

The real characters in the examples are:

Principal 
If  the principal character is

Primitive 

If the modulus is the absolute value of a  fundamental discriminant there is a real primitive character (there are two if the modulus is a multiple of 8); otherwise if there are any primitive characters they are imaginary.

Imprimitive

Applications

L-functions 

The Dirichlet L-series for a character  is

Dirichlet introduced the -function along with the characters in his 1837 paper.

Modular forms and functions 

Dirichlet characters appear several places in the theory of modular forms and functions.  A typical example is

Let  and let  be primitive.

If

define
,   
Then
. If  is a cusp form so is 
 
See theta series of a Dirichlet character for another example.

Gauss sum 

The Gauss sum of a Dirichlet character modulo  is

It appears in the functional equation of the Dirichlet L-function.

Jacobi sum 

 
Jacobi sums can be factored into products of Gauss sums.

Kloosterman sum 

If  is a Dirichlet character mod  and  the Kloosterman sum  is defined as

If  it is a Gauss sum.

Sufficient conditions 
It is not necessary to establish the defining  properties 1) – 3) to show that a function is a Dirichlet character.

From Davenport's book 

If  such that
1)   
2)   ,
3)   If  then , but
4)    is not always 0,
then  is one of the  characters mod

Sárközy's Condition 
A Dirichlet character is a completely multiplicative function  that satisfies a linear recurrence relation: that is, if 

Chudakov's Condition 

This equivalent definition of Dirichlet characters was conjectured by Chudakov in 1956, and proved in 2017 by Klurman and Mangerel.

See also 

 Character sum
 Multiplicative group of integers modulo n
 Primitive root modulo n
 Multiplicative character

Notes

References

External links 

 English translation of Dirichlet's 1837 paper on primes in arithmetic progressions
 LMFDB Lists 30,397,486 Dirichlet characters of modulus up to 10,000 and their L-functions

Analytic number theory
Zeta and L-functions